C. asiaticus may refer to:

 Caprimulgus asiaticus, a nightjar species
 Charadrius asiaticus, a wader species
 Cinnyris asiaticus, a sunbird species
 Conus asiaticus, a snail species

See also
 Asiaticus (disambiguation)